Frederick Labatt (1861 – 1 August 1947) was a New Zealand cricketer. He played in one first-class match for Canterbury in 1891/92.

See also
 List of Canterbury representative cricketers

References

External links
 

1861 births
1947 deaths
New Zealand cricketers
Canterbury cricketers
Sportspeople from County Londonderry